Bình Trung may refer to:

Bình Trung, Bắc Kạn, Vietnam
Bình Trung, Ba Ria-Vung Tau, Vietnam